Constant-Joseph Brochart (7 April 1816 – 7 May 1889) was a French artist known for the charm and colouration that he brought to portraits of young women and children.

Brochart was born in Lille and studied at the École des beaux-arts there before travelling to Paris where he made a name for himself in portraiture.

See also
Madame Clémentine Valensi Stora (L'Algérienne)

References

External links

Constant-Joseph Brochart at artnet.

1816 births
1889 deaths
French portrait painters
19th-century French painters
French male painters
19th-century French male artists